Semiannuloceras is an extinct genus of actively mobile carnivorous cephalopod of the family Baltoceratidae that lived in what would be Europe during the Ordovician from 490–460 mya, existing for approximately .

Taxonomy
Semiannuloceras was named by Evans (2005). Its type is Semiannuloceras abbeyense. It was assigned to Baltoceratidae by Evans (2005).

Morphology
The shell is usually long, and may be straight ("orthoconic") or gently curved. In life, these animals may have been similar to the modern squid, except for the long shell.

References

 Fossils (Smithsonian Handbooks) by David Ward

Prehistoric cephalopod genera
Ordovician cephalopods
Middle Ordovician extinctions
Prehistoric animals of Europe
Orthocerida